Astrid Peth is a fictional character played by Kylie Minogue in the long-running British science fiction television series Doctor Who. She is a one-off companion of the Tenth Doctor who appears in the episode "Voyage of the Damned", which was first broadcast in the UK on 25 December 2007. Minogue's casting in the role was a major coup for Doctor Who, her fame attracting much publicity for "Voyage of the Damned". Subsequently, much of the episode's success in terms of viewing figures was attributed to Minogue's appearance in the role.

Appearance

Television
Astrid appears in the episode "Voyage of the Damned". She is introduced aboard the starship Titanic as a humanoid waitress from the planet Sto with a dream of seeing the stars. Meeting the Tenth Doctor aboard Titanic, she quickly befriends him. She accompanies the Doctor (David Tennant) on a trip organised by Titanic'''s resident historian, Mr Copper (Clive Swift), teleporting with some Titanic passengers down to Earth where she and the Doctor meet Wilfred Mott (Bernard Cribbins). Upon their return to the ship, she and the Doctor discover the plan of Max Capricorn (George Costigan) to destroy the Titanic, its passengers and the nearby people of Earth with his villainous angelic robots, the Host. As they attempt to save the ship, Astrid grows increasingly fond of the Doctor, kissing him as part of what she assures is an "old tradition" on Sto. In the episode's climax, Astrid sacrifices herself to save the Doctor from Capricorn by driving Capricorn off a platform with a forklift truck and both appear to fall to their deaths. Later, realising Astrid was still wearing a teleporter bracelet, the Doctor attempts to recall her atoms in an attempt to resurrect her, but there is insufficient power aboard the damaged Titanic to do so. Astrid reappears spectral and bewildered, as the Doctor gives her a goodbye kiss before freeing her sentient atoms (described as "stardust") to roam space as energy.

Literature
In the 2013 novel Shroud of Sorrow, the Shroud, the main antagonist of the book, takes the form of deceased loved ones known to the people it approaches, in a bid to entice and entrap them. For the Eleventh Doctor, it takes the form of Astrid. The Doctor later uses a 'Once More With Feeling' device to revisit memories of losing friends, including Astrid's death, to generate enough personal grief that the Shroud releases its victims and latches on to him.

Development
Character creation

In August 2007, screenwriter and executive producer Russell T Davies announced that Astrid Peth would be the next companion, following the positive reception towards Martha Jones,  (played by Freema Agyeman). Astrid's surname, Peth, was confirmed in the Christmas edition of Radio Times. Davies has stated that the character was always going to be a "one-off" even before Minogue was cast and that Astrid would demonstrate "a whole new take – again – on what a companion can be". The name Astrid Peth generated some speculation before the episode's broadcast over the findings that Astrid is an anagram of TARDIS, and that Peth means thing in Welsh. However, the episode established no such connection. On Doctor Who Confidential, Minogue describes Astrid as a "dreamer" and that meeting with the Doctor rekindles Astrid's desire to explore. Later in his book A Writer's Tale Davies discussed with co-author Benjamin Cook how he had originally named the character "Peth" in a treatment but it bugged him, he later renamed her to "Astrid" giving the reason that it "...sounds more spacey, more like a futuristing  Doctor's companion".

Despite Davies stating that the companion in "Voyage of the Damned" was "always going to [be] a one-off...little knowing that it would be Kylie Minogue", he has since stated that he would cast Minogue again "like that". In 2008 The Daily Express quoted Minogue as saying there had been talk that her character could be reintroduced at a later date. Davies refused to comment when Doctor Who Magazine asked him about the rumours regarding Minogue's return to Doctor Who.

Casting
The BBC officially announced that Minogue was to feature as Astrid in the episode "Voyage of the Damned" on 3 July 2007. The official announcement followed rumours regarding Minogue's casting having already circulated in the press, although the episode's writer Russell T Davies had denied these rumours in in-house BBC publication Ariel in an attempt to keep the news secret for longer. Furthermore, Minogue herself had confirmed that she would be appearing in the episode in InStyle magazine, whilst the London paper Standard Lite published a photograph of Minogue's creative director Will Baker carrying a 'to do list' with a note about a Doctor Who script on it, thus indicating that Minogue would be in the episode. Minogue had also been sighted filming for Doctor Who by members of the public before the official announcement of her casting. Baker, a long-term Doctor Who fan, was largely responsible for Minogue's casting by setting up a meeting between her, Davies and Julie Gardner. Davies has claimed that Minogue was keen to appear on Doctor Who to relaunch her acting career.

Promotion and reception
Promotion
Minogue posed with a Dalek in an exclusive photo shoot for Doctor Who Magazine promoting "Voyage of the Damned". The shoot paid homage to actress Katy Manning's (who portrayed Jo Grant) famous nude photo shoot with a Dalek. Tenth Doctor actor David Tennant interviewed Minogue about her role as Astrid Peth on BBC Radio 2 in X-Amining Kylie first broadcast on 27 November 2007. Lengthier discussion about her involvement in "Voyage of the Damned" was included in the extended repeat of X-Amining Kylie, entitled Re-X-Amining Kylie, broadcast on Boxing Day 2007. It was leaked to The Sun and other media outlets that Astrid would kiss the Doctor.

Reception
The episode was seen by 13.8 million watching at its peak, according to consolidated ratings, when it was first broadcast on Christmas Day on BBC One. The ratings success of "Voyage of the Damned" has been partially and fully attributed to Minogue's casting in the role of Astrid. Younger viewers who were fans of pop star Kylie were left distraught by Astrid's death and had to be convinced that Kylie was not dead in real life.

Although reviewer Jane Simon would have liked to have seen more of the character and it has been asserted that her appearance in the episode has helped her make "a full return to the limelight", Minogue's appearance was not universally praised. Gareth McLean, a TV writer for The Guardian, described Minogue as "not that good...she's blank and insipid". McLean wrote:

There's no chemistry between Astrid and the Doctor, she delivers her lines with a real lack of conviction and thus we never really believe in Astrid as a character. Where Catherine Tate's Donna in last year's special was overbearing, Kylie Minogue's Astrid is hardly there at all. It does make you wonder why casting Kylie was regarded as a coup. She's a pop star – of course she's going to say yes to being beamed into millions of homes in the run-up to Christmas. She's got a duff album to sell. In truth, Kylie should be grateful to [Doctor Who].

David Belcher of The Herald wrote that Minogue looked too old to play a waitress. Sam Wollaston of The Guardian claimed Kylie's performance was "disappointing" and did not live up to those of Freema Agyeman or Billie Piper in Doctor Who. Jim Shelley of The Mirror stated that Minogue did not "look vivacious enough to be worth all the fuss". Conversely, Paddy Shennan of the Liverpool Echo accused the makers of cynically including shots of Minogue's cleavage and legs. Tim Teeman of the Times Online described Astrid as "gutsy", but commented on Minogue's "older" appearance and likened her "breathy delivery" to her performance as Charlene Mitchell in Neighbours. In 2012, Will Salmon of SFX named Astrid's demise as one of the five worst companion departures, writing that her death circumstance was "a bit daft" and her starlight farewell was a "laughably mawkish scene".

Billie Piper, who portrayed former companion Rose Tyler, commented that it was a "great idea" to cast Minogue, and was disappointed to miss meeting and befriending her on the set of Doctor Who as Tennant had done.

In "Journey's End", Davros taunts the Doctor about the countless people who have died for him. A clip from "Voyage of the Damned" featuring Astrid is shown as part of a montage. Character Options has produced an action figure of Astrid for inclusion in a "Voyage of Damned" action figure box set.

References
Citations

Websites

Media notes and print sources

External links

Astrid Peth on the BBC's Doctor Who'' character guide (archived from 2021)

Doctor Who aliens
Doctor Who companions
Female characters in television
Kylie Minogue
Television characters introduced in 2007
Fictional waiting staff